Church Street School in Nutley, Essex County, New Jersey, United States, also known an Nutley Museum, was built in 1875.  It was listed on the National Register of Historic Places in 1995.  It contains items from local history as well as Annie Oakley artifacts.

See also 
 National Register of Historic Places listings in Essex County, New Jersey

References

External links
Nutley Historical Society

Italianate architecture in New Jersey
School buildings completed in 1875
History museums in New Jersey
Museums in Essex County, New Jersey
School buildings on the National Register of Historic Places in New Jersey
Nutley, New Jersey
National Register of Historic Places in Essex County, New Jersey
New Jersey Register of Historic Places